The National Association of Licensed house Managers (NALHM) was a trade union representing publicans in the United Kingdom.

The union was founded in 1970, in response to a growing trend of breweries purchasing public houses and then employing managers to run them.  It affiliated to the General Federation of Trade Unions and to the Trades Union Congress, and by 1996 had 7,109 members.  In 1997, it merged into the Transport and General Workers' Union.

General Secretaries
1970: Harry Shindler
1990s: Peter Love

Further reading
Mutch, A. (2002) A managerial trade union and changes in the hospitality industry: the National Association of Licensed House Managers, 1970-1997

References

Trade unions in the United Kingdom
Trade unions established in 1970
Trade unions disestablished in 1997
Transport and General Workers' Union amalgamations
Trade unions based in Cheshire